Schönberger Land is an Amt in the district of Nordwestmecklenburg, in Mecklenburg-Vorpommern, Germany. The seat of the Amt is in Schönberg.

In 2013, the Amt had around 18,000 inhabitants. It is close to the cities of Lübeck, Wismar and Schwerin and is part of the Hamburg Metropolitan Region.

Following recent changes to local government boundaries, the Amt Schönberger Land now consists of the following municipalities:
Dassow (since January 1, 2005)
Grieben 
Lüdersdorf 
Menzendorf 
Roduchelstorf 
Schönberg (since January 1, 2004)
Selmsdorf (since January 1, 2005)
Siemz-Niendorf

References

Ämter in Mecklenburg-Western Pomerania